Heinrich Leutwyler (born Oct 12, 1938) is a Swiss theoretical physicist, with interests in elementary particle physics, the theory of strong interactions, and quantum field theory.

Early life and education 
Leutwyler went to the Gymnasium in Bern and studied physics, mathematics, and astronomy at the University of Bern. After the diploma in 1960 he went to the US, including Princeton. In 1962 he received his PhD under the supervision of John R. Klauder (at Bell Laboratories at the time), for his thesis entitled "Generally covariant Dirac equation and associated Boson Fields."

Career 
In 1965 he got his habilitation in Bern, where he became assistant professor in the same year and full professor in 1969, until his retirement in 2000.

In 1983/84 he was dean of the Faculty of Sciences. Leutwyler spent research visits at the Bell Labs in Murray Hill (1963, 1965), at Caltech in Pasadena (1973/74), and at CERN (1969/70, 1983/84, and 1996). Together with Murray Gell-Mann and Harald Fritzsch, Leutwyler was crucially involved in establishing quantum chromodynamics (QCD) as the fundamental theory of strong interactions. Together with Jürg Gasser he performed influential work on chiral perturbation theory, an effective field theory describing QCD at low energies, including the Gasser-Leutwyler coefficients of the effective Lagrangian and the determination of current quark masses.  

Leutwyler received an honorary doctorate of the  Johannes Gutenberg University Mainz (1995), the Humboldt Award (2000), the Pomeranchuk Prize (2011), and the Sakurai Prize (2023).

Personal life 
He is married and has two children.

Literature 
Fritzsch, Gellmann, and Leutwyler: Advantages of the color octet gluon picture. In: Physics Letters B, volume 47, 1973, p. 365
Gasser and Leutwyler: Quark masses. In: Physics Reports, volume 87, 1982, p. 77
Gasser and Leutwyler: Chiral Perturbation Theory to One Loop. In: Annals of Physics, volume 158,  1984, p. 142
Gasser and Leutwyler: Chiral Perturbation Theory: Expansions in the Mass of the Strange Quark. In: Nuclear Physics B, volume 250,  1985, p. 465
Leutwyler, On the history of the strong interaction, Erice 2012

Weblinks 
Webpage at the University of Bern

References 

1938 births
Living people
20th-century American physicists
21st-century American physicists
Swiss physicists
Scientists from Bern
University of Bern alumni
Particle physicists
Humboldt Research Award recipients